Arnaud Briand (born 29 April 1970) is a Canadian-born French former ice hockey player. He competed in the men's tournaments at the 1992, 1994, 1998 and the 2002 Winter Olympics.

References

External links
 

1970 births
Living people
Augsburger Panther players
Boxers de Bordeaux players
Canadian ice hockey centres
Courmaosta HC players
Dragons de Rouen players
French ice hockey centres
Olympic ice hockey players of France
Ice hockey players at the 1992 Winter Olympics
Ice hockey players at the 1994 Winter Olympics
Ice hockey players at the 1998 Winter Olympics
Ice hockey players at the 2002 Winter Olympics
Luleå HF players
People from Sydney, Nova Scotia
Ice hockey people from Nova Scotia
Hockey Club de Reims players
Saint-Jean Castors players
Sportspeople from the Cape Breton Regional Municipality